Night in the Woods is a 2017 single-player adventure video game developed by Infinite Fall, Secret Lab and published by Finji. 

The game was funded via Kickstarter, where it earned over 400% of its initial  funding goal.

It is a story-focused exploration game in which the player follows a young woman named Mae Borowski, who recently dropped out of college and has returned to her hometown to find unexpected changes. 

Prior to the release of Night in the Woods, a companion game titled Longest Night was released in December 2013 by Holowka and Benson, along with co-writer Bethany Hockenberry. In December 2014, a second supplemental game was released, titled Lost Constellation.

The game was released on February 21, 2017 for Microsoft Windows, macOS, Linux, and PlayStation 4. The Xbox One version was released on December 13, 2017. An extended version of the game, titled the Weird Autumn edition, was released for PC, macOS, Linux, PlayStation 4 and Xbox One on December 13, 2017 and also for Nintendo Switch on February 1, 2018. It features new content not seen in the first release, as well as the supplemental games. A version for iOS was released later on September 9, 2021. 

Night in the Woods received notable critical praise, mostly for its soundtrack, story, dialogue and characters.

Overview and gameplay
Mae has returned home to Possum Springs, a town populated by zoomorphic humans. Now living in her parents' attic, she discovers how much times have changed since the closing of the town's coal mines. She is forced to confront a horrible secret the town has hidden for decades involving not only the town's mine, but also the recent disappearance of her longtime friend Casey. Mae's friends also include Bea, a cigarette-smoking crocodile and Mae's childhood friend; Gregg, a hyperactive fox; and his boyfriend, a bear named Angus. Paste magazine describes the themes covered as "mental illness, depression, the stagnancy of the middle and lower classes, and the slow death of small town America."

Scott Benson described the key actions for the player as "explore, converse, see and touch", while Alec Holowka described their approach as "narrative-focused" rather than "gameplay-first". Players make decisions that affect the course of the story, though Benson said, "it's more like 'do you hang out with this person?' Okay, cool. That person might not know you as well by the end of the game, but this person you hung out with, you're going to get to see their storyline."

Plot
Margaret "Mae" Borowski is a 20-year-old college dropout, who relocates back to her Rust Belt-inspired hometown of Possum Springs, where the closure of local coal mines has led to visible economic stagnation. She meets up with her old friends, including gloomy but intelligent Beatrice "Bea" Santello, hyperactive delinquent Greggory "Gregg" Lee, and his quiet modest boyfriend Angus Delaney. Mae also learns that another one of her old friends, Casey Hartley, has mysteriously disappeared.

Mae spends several days exploring Possum Springs and hanging out with her friends, but she also begins to have strange and vivid dreams. At the town's autumn "Harfest" (Halloween) festival, she witnesses a teenager being kidnapped by a mysterious figure, whom Mae believes is a ghost; her friends are skeptical. The four hesitantly work together to figure out the goings-on, as Mae's mental health slowly deteriorates with each dream. After intensive investigation, the friends come across a mysterious group of cloaked figures in the woods, who give chase; Mae falls and lapses into a coma, while her friends manage to escape.

Mae is rescued by churchgoers, then eventually wakes up and returns to her friends, where she reveals that she dropped out due to her increasing dissociation from people and the world, seeing everything as mere shapes. Mae's journal, in which she draws pictures for each major in-game event, was given to her by the town doctor to write down her emotions after she bludgeoned a student with a softball bat during a dissociative episode six years prior to the game's events. This incident caused the townsfolk to become wary of Mae and imposed a financial and emotional strain on her family. Mae's dissociation worsened at college, so she chose to return home, hoping that being in a familiar place would help her return to normal.

Still wounded, Mae ventures out into the woods to find the hooded group, only for Gregg, Bea, and Angus to arrive, refusing to let her go alone. The group enters the old mines and confronts the mysterious cult, who has been kidnapping people who "will not be missed", including their missing friend Casey, into the mines to be sacrificed to a god-like chthonic entity called the Black Goat in the hope that it will revitalize the economy of Possum Springs. The cult's leader allows the group to leave, threatening them never to tell anyone about the cult. But while the group is leaving in the mine's elevator, a cultist ambushes them and attacks Mae. The others manage to save her and the elevator falls, collapsing the mine and presumably trapping the cult underground.

The next day, depending on whom the player interacted with the most throughout the course of the game, Mae sits down with either Bea or Gregg and discusses the events of the previous night, and all the happenings in Possum Springs. The others join them shortly after, and Mae learns that although they will all be forced to grow and adapt to life, for better or for worse, they can still enjoy their time together now. The game ends with the four deciding to forget about their problems for the time being and have band practice.

Development
Prior to the release of Night in the Woods, a companion game titled Longest Night was released in December 2013 by Holowka and Benson, along with co-writer Bethany Hockenberry. In December 2014, a second supplemental game was released, titled Lost Constellation.

Night in the Woods was announced on October 22, 2013 via Kickstarter. Holowka and Benson set a  funding goal, which was reached in only 26 hours. The additional funding allowed Infinite Fall to hire animator Charles Huettner to create additional animations, and for Infinite Ammo and game developer Adam Saltsman to create a roguelike that is playable within Night in the Woods. While Benson believed adding further stretch goals would result in additional backers, Infinite Fall limited the amount of stretch goals to avoid scope creep. Benson names Chris Ware, Mike Mignola, Mary Blair, Flannery O’Connor, and Richard Scarry as influences on his work on Night in the Woods. He later stated the name was taken from the first song in The World/Inferno Friendship Society's album The Bridgewater Astral League, which influenced certain themes in the game, as well.

In October 2017, it was announced that the game would be ported to iOS devices by Australian studio Secret Lab, who created the narrative engine used by the game. The port was tentatively due for release in 2018, but released on September 9, 2021. In January 2018, the game was officially announced for the Nintendo Switch, and was released for the console the following month, including all content from the Weird Autumn edition. A physical version was planned to be released through Limited Run Games, but was delayed indefinitely after the rest of the development team cut their ties with Holowka, following accusations of physical and emotional abuse by Holowka's ex-partner Zoë Quinn. Five years after the game's release, Limited Run Games would officially start accepting preorders for the physical version starting December 18, 2022 and lasting until January 29, 2023. The collector's edition includes the game, the soundtracks for both the main game and Demon Tower on CD, acrylic stands, a coin, a physical version of Mae's journal, a planisphere, glow-in-the-dark cards and sticker sheets.

Soundtrack
Alec Holowka created the soundtrack for Night in the Woods. Three albums of the game's music were released via Bandcamp on March 9, 2017. Holowka named DIIV as a large influence on the game's score.

Reception

Night in the Woods received very favourable reviews. On Metacritic, the PS4 version has an average score of 87 from 15 critics, and the PC version has an average score of 88 from 30 critics. Praise is mainly given to the writing and characters. In his review of both Night in the Woods and Tom Clancy's Ghost Recon Wildlands, Ben "Yahtzee" Croshaw of Zero Punctuation called the game "a solid 'worth checking out'" and complimented its "strong writing" while stating his reservations about the game's pacing and tone. In Japan, where the PlayStation 4 and Switch versions were ported and published by Playism on March 28, 2019, Famitsu gave them each a score of one nine and three eights for a total of 33 out of 40.

Eurogamer ranked the game 13th on their list of the "Top 50 Games of 2017", and GamesRadar+ ranked it 17th on their list of the 25 Best Games of 2017, while Polygon ranked it 23rd on their list of the 50 best games of 2017. The game was nominated for "Best Comedy Game" in PC Gamers 2017 Game of the Year Awards. It won the award for "Best Adventure Game" in IGN's Best of 2017 Awards, whereas its other nominations were for "Best Art Direction", "Best Story", and "Best Original Music". In Giant Bomb's 2017 Game of the Year Awards, the game won the award for "Best Cast of Characters", and was a runner-up each for "Best Debut", "Best Story", and "Game of the Year". It also won the award for "Best Character" (Mae) and "Best Dialogue" in Game Informers 2017 Adventure Game of the Year Awards. Before that, the game won the award "Best 2D Visuals" and the overall award "Golden Cube" in the Unity Awards 2017, whereas it was nominated for "Best Desktop/Console Game".

Awards

Legacy
Penelope Scott's 2020 song Rät, references the game in its lyrics, specifically Selmers' dream of leaving Possum Springs.

In June 2022, during a Portland Timbers match against Houston Dynamo FC, Mae was depicted in a banner with an axe in a three-banner display, reading "From Stonewall a brick and Portland an axe, respect our pride or expect our wrath". The developers have stated that Mae's character is pansexual. In a tweet in reaction to the banner, Scott Benson stated that he endorsed the message and that his "jaw dropped" upon seeing it.

References

External links

2017 video games
Adventure games
Cats in popular culture
Crowdfunded video games
Exploration video games
Halloween video games
Independent Games Festival winners
Kickstarter-funded video games
Games financed by Indie Fund
LGBT-related video games
Linux games
MacOS games
Video games about cults
Video games about mental health
Nintendo Switch games
Playism games
PlayStation 4 games
PlayStation Network games
Seumas McNally Grand Prize winners
Side-scrolling video games
Single-player video games
Video games about animals
Video games about cats
Video games developed in Canada
Video games featuring female protagonists
Video games set in forests
Windows games
Xbox Cloud Gaming games
Xbox One games
Finji games
Video games designed by Alec Holowka
BAFTA winners (video games)
IOS games